SS Tyrconnel, was a coastal cargo vessel which was purchased by the Isle of Man Steam Packet Company, in 1911.

Construction and dimensions
Tyrconnel was a single-screw steel steamship, and was built by J. Fullerton of Paisley in 1892. J. Fullerton also supplied her engines and boilers. Tyrconnel had a registered tonnage of 274 tons; length 130'; beam 22'; depth 10'2". She was powered by a two-cylinder compound engine, which gave her a speed of 9 knots.

Service life
She was first registered in Glasgow in 1892, then in Derry in 1895. No record of the vessel remains in the Derry Custom's House, but she presumably traded from the port until she was bought by the Manx Steam Trading Company of Castletown in 1902.

On Monday 12 September 1904, Tyrconnel went to the aid of the Castletown trading schooner Bessie. The Tyrconnel had spotted the Bessie approximately 3 miles off Niarbyl, Isle of Man flying a distress flag. Captain Collister proceeded to give assistance, however damage was sustained to one of Tyrconnel's lifeboats.
The Bessie was eventually taken under tow by the Tyrconnel, and they proceeded to Peel Harbour.

She was acquired by the Isle of Man Steam Packet Company in 1911 at a cost of £4,875 (equivalent to £ in ), and worked the coastal trade until 1932.

Tyrconnel was the first small cargo ship the Steam Packet had bought second hand. She looked typical of her class of vessel, with funnel and machinery amidships. Her funnel could be described as off-white with black top and this was never changed to the Steam Packet's familiar black and red.

Disposal
Tyrconnel was withdrawn from service and sold to S.W. Coe & Company in 1932.  Tyrconnel was broken up in Danzig, Poland, in 1934.

Official number and code letters 
Official numbers are issued by individual flag states. They should not be confused with IMO ship identification numbers. Tyrconnel had the UK Official Number 99794 and originally used the Code Letters  N D P B .

References

Bibliography
 Chappell, Connery (1980). Island Lifeline T.Stephenson & Sons Ltd 

Ships of the Isle of Man Steam Packet Company
1892 ships
Steamships of the United Kingdom